Travis Ford (born December 29, 1969) is an American college basketball coach, who is currently the head coach of the Saint Louis Billikens men's basketball team. He was also previously the head coach at Campbellsville University, Eastern Kentucky, Massachusetts, and Oklahoma State. Prior to that, he played at the University of Missouri and the University of Kentucky.

Playing career
While attending Madisonville North Hopkins High School, Ford's team lost to Marshall County, led by future Vanderbilt signees Aaron Beth and Dan Hall, in the state quarterfinals.  Ford entered the University of Missouri in 1989. He played basketball for the Missouri Tigers and was named to the Big Eight Conference All-Freshman team. The following year, Ford transferred to the University of Kentucky and sat out the 1990–91 season due to NCAA rules on transfers. After playing sparingly his sophomore year, Ford was a starter during his junior and senior years, and set school records in single-game assists (15), single-season three-point field goals (101) and consecutive free throws made (50). Ford was named to the All-SEC team his junior and senior years, and was recognized as the Southeast Region's Most Outstanding Player in the 1993 NCAA tournament.

After an unsuccessful attempt at an NBA career, Ford landed the role of Danny O'Grady in the 1997 movie The 6th Man, starring Marlon Wayans and Kadeem Hardison.

Coaching career

Campbellsville
In 1997, Ford was offered the head coach job at Campbellsville University. He accepted the position, and in 1999 led the Tigers to a 28–3 record, earning Mid-South Conference Coach of the Year honors.

Eastern Kentucky
In 2000, Ford accepted the head coaching position at Eastern Kentucky University in Richmond, Kentucky. In five seasons at EKU, Ford led the Colonels from a 7–19 record his first year to a 22–9 record and an Ohio Valley Conference championship in 2005. In a much publicized first-round NCAA Tournament matchup with his alma mater, the University of Kentucky, Ford's team pushed the Wildcats to the limit before losing 72–64.

UMass
After the 2004–05 season, Ford accepted the head coaching position at the University of Massachusetts Amherst. During his first season, 2005–06, with the Minutemen, Ford posted a 13–15 record, 8–8 in the Atlantic 10 Conference. The 2006–07 season saw Ford coach UMass to the fifth most wins in school history with an overall mark of 24–9. The team shared the Atlantic 10 Conference regular season title with Xavier, going 13–3, but lost to Saint Louis in the second round of the Atlantic 10 tournament. After earning a #4 seed in the postseason National Invitation Tournament, UMass defeated Alabama before losing in the second round to eventual NIT champion West Virginia. The team featured Atlantic 10 Player of the Year Stéphane Lasme. After the season ended, Ford's name was circulated as a long-shot replacement for the head coaching position at Ford's alma mater, the University of Kentucky. These rumors were put to rest when after the season on April 10, 2007, UMass announced that Ford had signed a five-year contract extension.

The 2007–08 season was arguably even more successful for Ford and Massachusetts. The team finished the season with a 25–11 record and a 10–6 record in the Atlantic 10 Conference. After losing in the A-10 tournament to Charlotte, UMass accepted an invitation to the NIT for the second straight year. They defeated Stephen F. Austin, Akron, Syracuse and Florida to make it to the NIT Finals. In the NIT Finals, they lost to Ohio State 92–85. Ohio State had made the previous year's NCAA championship game. Despite the team's postseason success and the previous year's contract extension, Ford would leave the next season for Oklahoma State.

Oklahoma State
On April 16, 2008, Oklahoma State hired Ford to become the head basketball coach. In his first season, Ford led the Cowboys to a 23–12 overall record, with a 9–7 record in conference. He led Oklahoma State to its first NCAA tournament appearance since the 2004–05 season. In the tournament, Oklahoma State beat Tennessee before being knocked off by Pittsburgh in the second round. In year two, Ford's Cowboys finished 22–11, 9–7 in conference. The year was highlighted by wins over a top ten Kansas State on the road and a home win over #1 ranked Kansas. Big 12 player of the year James Anderson was instrumental in both wins and became Travis Ford's first Cowboy to be selected in the first round of the NBA draft.

Prior to the 2010–11 season, Ford signed McDonald's All-American recruit Marcus Smart. The Cowboys finished 24–9 overall, 13–5 in conference. Ford's fifth season was highlighted by a huge win in Lawrence, Kansas against Kansas – the first win by OSU at Kansas since 1989. Marcus Smart was named the Wayman Tisdale National Freshman of the Year and Big 12 Player of the Year. Oklahoma State earned a 5 seed in the NCAA tournament but failed to advance after a disappointing loss to #12 seed Oregon. Travis Ford had three key players announce their return for the 2013–14 season in Marcus Smart, Lebryan Nash, and Markel Brown. A promising non-conference start was followed by a stumbling conference slate and the team finished 21–13, 8–10 in Big 12 play. A loss to Gonzaga in the Second Round (formerly known as the First Round) of the NCAA tournament followed. Another difficult season followed as the Cowboys finished the season 18–14, 8–10 in Big 12 play with a disappointing Second Round loss to Oregon in the NCAA tournament. The 2015–16 season was even worse, OSU finished the season 12–20, 3–15 in Big 12 play.

On March 18, 2016, it was announced that Ford and the Cowboys agreed to part ways after 8 years as head coach.

Saint Louis
On March 30, 2016, Saint Louis University announced that  Ford has been hired as the head basketball coach.  He inherited a Billikens team that had gone a disappointing 11–21 each of the previous two seasons under head coach Jim Crews.   Due to a lack of talent from the previous regime, SLU was predicted to finish dead last of the Atlantic 10 conference during the 2016–17 season.  Basketball statistician Ken Pomeroy predicted the Billikens as the team most likely to go winless throughout its conference schedule.  Ford led the Billikens to six Atlantic 10 conference wins and a 12–21 overall record.

Head coaching record

* Campbellsville forfeited 9 games in the season due to an ineligible player.

References

External links
 Saint Louis profile
 
 

1969 births
Living people
American male film actors
American men's basketball coaches
American men's basketball players
Basketball coaches from Kentucky
Basketball players from Kentucky
Campbellsville Tigers men's basketball coaches
College men's basketball head coaches in the United States
Eastern Kentucky Colonels men's basketball coaches
Kentucky Wildcats men's basketball players
Missouri Tigers men's basketball players
Oklahoma State Cowboys basketball coaches
Parade High School All-Americans (boys' basketball)
People from Madisonville, Kentucky
Point guards
Saint Louis Billikens men's basketball coaches
UMass Minutemen basketball coaches
Universiade gold medalists for the United States
Universiade medalists in basketball